Ghetto Music: The Blueprint of Hip Hop is the third album from Boogie Down Productions. The album was certified Gold by the RIAA on September 25, 1989. The album ranked 36th on Top R&B/Hip-Hop Albums and 7th on Billboard 200 and was certified gold by the Recording Industry Association of America (RIAA) on September 25, 1989.

Track listing
All tracks produced by KRS-One

Instrumental credits
All tracks are co-produced by D-Nice, D-Square, Rebekah Foster, Spaceman Patterson and Sidney Mills
Afrika provides scratches on "Jah Rulez"

Charts

Singles

Certifications

References

Jive Records albums
1989 albums
Boogie Down Productions albums
RCA Records albums
Albums produced by KRS-One